A formal Gaelic language name consists of a given name and a surname. First names are either native or nativized (i.e. borrowed and made to fit the Gaelic sound system). Surnames are generally patronymic, i.e. they refer to a historical ancestor. The form of a surname varies according to whether its bearer is male (e.g. "MacDonald") or female (e.g. However, when used in the female form the first letter is lenited (if possible).

First names
Gaelic first names chiefly hail from 5 linguistic layers, Goidelic and 4 others, coinciding with the main languages of contact: Latin, Norse, Anglo-Norman and Scots. Unusually, male first names outnumber female first names by about a factor of 2:1.

Goidelic names
This layer can be broadly split into three main types:

 descriptive names (nouns or adjectives), e.g.  "fair, bright",  "bear"
 old compounds (names which had fused to the extent of now being opaque); e.g.,  "Donald" (*Dumnoualos "world strength"),  "Murdo" (*Moricatus "sea battle")
 compounds, e.g.  "Dunlevy" ("brown one of the mountain"),  "Gilchrist" ("servant of Christ")

The first two categories were no longer productive for the most part towards the end of the Old Irish period but the last type persisted, reinforced by the coinage of ecclesiastical names following Christianization.

Norse names
Quite a number of names still common hail from the period of Norse contact:
  < 
  < 
  <  
  <

Anglo-Norman
Names from this layer include:
  <

Scots
Scots names which have been borrowed into Gaelic include:
  <

Latin
Names which were borrowed from Latin include:
  < 
  <

Borrowing into English/Scots

A fair number of Gaelic names were borrowed into English or Scots at different periods (e.g. Kenneth, Duncan, Donald, Malcolm, Calum, Lachlan, Alasdair, Iain, Eilidh), although it can sometimes be difficult to tell if the donor language was Irish or Scottish Gaelic (e.g. Deirdre, Rory, Kennedy, Bridget/Bride, Aiden). On occasion, the same name was borrowed more than once due to misinterpretation of Gaelic morphology.

Others were with no cognate were often equated with English/Scots names which bore some similarity to the Gaelic name in order to obtain "English equivalents". This includes  which was equated with Euphemia or Henrietta,  with Dorothy,  with Rebecca or Sophie.

Surnames
The majority of Gaelic surnames in the Highlands and western parts are patronymic in nature and of Goidelic extraction, although epithets, geography or occupation and borrowings also occur in some surnames. However, many surnames are derived from topographical features or place names, Such surnames include Caddenhead/, Cadell/, Cleghorne/, Dalzell/, Dalrimple/, Elphin/, Inverbervie/, Kelty/, Learmonth/, Ochiltree/ and many more. 

Campbell/ "crooked mouth" and Cameron/ "crooked nose" are two examples of surnames based on epithets, while Fraser/ is an example of a borrowing (from Anglo-French ).

The usage of patronymic surnames was much more varied than is generally assumed. Historically, clan surnames were used by the descendants or dependants of an ancestor but not generally by everyone in the clan territory. Only with the advent of a non-Gaelic speaking administration were clan surnames applied en-masse to people in a clan's territory.

Formation
Patronymic surnames for men feature either the  word  "son" (e.g. , lit. son of Donald) or the nominalizing suffix  (e.g. ). In the case of women, the word  is used, a shortening of the full phrase  "daughter of the son of").

In Classical Gaelic culture, clans could also feature the word  (alt. ) "grandchild, descendant" (spelled ogha // in Modern Gaelic), e.g. "Duibhne's descendant", the original surname of the Campbells (Duibhne was a Celtic goddess). In speaking, ua/ó in names became reduced to [ə], as happened also in Northern Irish and Manx, and disappeared from Anglicised forms.

As a result of misspellings, one Gaelic surname often corresponds to numerous English/Scots forms, e.g.  "son of Duncan" may appear as: Donagh(y), Donnagh, Dono(u)gh, MacConachie, MacConachy, MacConaghy, MacConchy, MacConechie, MacConkey, MacConnachie, MacConnechie, MacConnichie, MacConochie, MacConoughy, MacDona, MacDonachie, MacDonachy, MacDonaghy, MacDonaugh, MacDonnach, MacDonnagh, MacDonnoghie, MacDonogh, MacDonoghue, MacDonough, MacDunphy, MacKonochie, MacOnachie, MacOnechy, MacOnochie, Donohue or Donohoe (ignoring the Mac/Mc variation).

Nicknames
Nicknames in Gaelic operate similarly to those in other languages and usually indicate a physical characteristic, an occupation, a location or an incident the person is associated and so forth.

Some examples

Character traits
  ("Catriona on her own"), a woman who enjoyed doing everything on her own

Geographical references
  ("The Orcadian"), a man who used to fish around the Orkney Islands in his youth
  ("Pabbay yearling"), a woman who had been a year old when the Isle of Pabbay was cleared of people

Humorous names
  ("Calum Sailor"), an unusual name for a woman who was in the habit of wearing a sailor's cap
  ("The town bell"), a man with a very loud voice

Occupation
  ("Alan the cook"), a man who was employed at one time as the cook at Ormacleit Castle
  ("Angus the banker"), a man who was employed in a bank in Nova Scotia
  ("Duncan the stonemason" but always presented in English as the literal translation, "Duncan Stoner"), a known 19th and 20th century resident of /Auchindrain township in Argyll, Scotland: used for Duncan Munro, d. 1937.
  ("Donald on wheels"), used in Argyll in the 1920s to describe a Donald MacCallum who ran a mobile grocer's shop in a van

Physical characteristics
  ("The old man of the cold")
  ("Calum of the leg"), a man who had a short leg
  ("Donald of the ear"), a man who is said to have lost an ear in a fight
  ("Fair Robert"), a man called Robert with light-coloured hair

Other
  ("The lost one"), a man who had become lost, causing the entire village to spend the night looking for him
  ("Ivor of the wooden bow"), a renowned archer and one time resident of Pabay
  ("Bella who lives by the muddy place"), used for Isabella McCallum (1822–1915) of /Auchindrain township in Argyll, Scotland: her house was close to the ford where the cattle crossed the burn

Identifying names

Due to the relative paucity of names and surnames in Gaelic, the official name of a person (i.e. first name plus a surname, in Gaelic or English/Scots) is rarely used in Gaelic speaking communities as, with a small number of surnames usually predominating in an area, there are usually several people who go by the same combination, for example John MacLeod might apply to several people in the same village. In everyday life, this is usually solved by using the first name of a man, followed by the first name of his father in the genitive case or by using the first name plus an epithet. The (fictitious) family tree below illustrates this custom.

Historically, such an identifying name would take the  "son" element, e.g.

Identifying names sometimes use female reference points, for example if a local woman marries an outsider, this may result in the children being identified via the mother.  ("Kirsten's Donald") for instance would indicate a son called Donald with a mother called Kirsten.

See also
 Celtic onomastics
 Icelandic names, which still use patronymics
 Irish name
 Russian patronymics
 List of Scottish Gaelic given names
 List of Scottish Gaelic surnames
 Scottish toponymy
 Welsh surnames
Scottish names in Ulster

Notes

References

Scottish Gaelic language

Names by culture